The Scrip Range is a subrange of the Monashee Mountains of the Columbia Mountains, located on the west side of Lake Revelstoke and north of Hoskins Creek in British Columbia, Canada.

References

Scrip Range in the Canadian Mountain Encyclopedia

Monashee Mountains